George Darby Haviland (1857–1901) was a British surgeon and naturalist.  He was born at Warbleton, Sussex in England.  He served as Director of the Raffles Museum in Singapore as well as being a medical officer in Sarawak and Curator of the Sarawak Museum in Kuching from 1891 to 1893.  In 1895 he returned to England and worked at the Kew Herbarium in London before going to South Africa where he died in Natal.

Plant species
Some plant species named for Haviland:
Alangium havilandii
Alsophila havilandii
Barringtonia havilandii
Chionanthus havilandii
Diospyros havilandii
Lithocarpus havilandii
Shorea havilandii
Vatica havilandii
Voacanga havilandii
Xanthophyllum havilandii

His zoological author abbreviation is Haviland.

References

1857 births
1901 deaths
British curators
British surgeons
British botanists
People from Warbleton
British naturalists